The 1935 Humboldt State Lumberjacks football team represented Humboldt State College during the 1935 college football season. They competed as an independent.

The 1935 Lumberjacks were led by first-year head coach Charlie Erb. They played home games at Albee Stadium in Eureka, California. Humboldt State finished with a record of six wins, one loss and one tie (6–1–1). The Lumberjacks outscored their opponents 134–44 for the season.

Schedule

Notes

References

Humboldt State
Humboldt State Lumberjacks football seasons
Humboldt State Lumberjacks football